A Very Brady Renovation is an American reality television miniseries airing on HGTV. It showcases the renovation of the Studio City, California house that was used for many of the exterior shots in the 1969–1974 American sitcom The Brady Bunch. The house was purchased by HGTV in 2018 for $3.5 million. The renovation was completed in May 2019 and the miniseries premiered on September 9, with the surviving Brady Bunch cast appearing in the program.

Cast
The Brady Bunch original cast members (appearing as themselves on this series)
 Barry Williams (Greg)
 Maureen McCormick (Marcia)
 Christopher Knight (Peter)
 Eve Plumb (Jan)
 Mike Lookinland (Bobby)
 Susan Olsen (Cindy)
Renovators
 Jonathan & Drew Scott (Property Brothers)
 Mina Starsiak & Karen E. Laine (Good Bones)
 Leanne & Steve Ford (Restored by the Fords)
 Jasmine Roth (Hidden Potential) 
 Lara Spencer (Flea Market Flip)

Episodes

Ratings 
HGTV announced that over 28 million total viewers had watched the series over the four-week period.

Awards and nominations

References

External links
 A Very Brady Renovation

2019 American television series debuts
2019 American television series endings
2010s American reality television series
The Brady Bunch
HGTV original programming
Studio City, Los Angeles
Television shows set in California